Frederick Glyn, 4th Baron Wolverton (24 September 1864 – 3 October 1932), was a British banker and Conservative politician. He served as Vice-Chamberlain of the Household under Arthur Balfour from 1902 to 1905.

Background
Glyn was the younger son of Vice-Admiral the Honourable Henry Carr Glyn, younger son of George Glyn, 1st Baron Wolverton. His mother was Rose Mahoney, daughter of Reverend Denis Mahoney, of Dromore Castle, County Kerry. He was a partner in the family banking firm of Glyn, Mills & Co.

Political career
In 1888 Glyn succeeded in the barony on the early death of his elder brother Henry Glyn and took his seat on the Conservative benches in the House of Lords. He served in the Conservative administration of Arthur Balfour as Vice-Chamberlain of the Household from late November 1902 to December 1905.

In late 1902 Lord and Lady Wolverton visited British India to attend the 1903 Delhi Durbar.

Military career
Lord Wolverton was commissioned a Second lieutenant in the North Somerset Yeomanry on 29 January 1900. After the outbreak of the Second Boer War, Lord Wolverton volunteered for active service and joined the Imperial Yeomanry. He left Southampton on board the SS Scot in late January 1900, and arrived in South Africa the following month. He served in the Orange Free State, where in March 1900 he is reported to be attached to the force which occupied Rouxville.

He was appointed Honorary Colonel of the 2nd (South Middlesex) Volunteer Rifle Corps on 29 August 1903, and when the unit was merged into the 13th (Kensington) Battalion, London Regiment, in the new Territorial Force in 1908, Wolverton helped to set up a new 10th Battalion, Middlesex Regiment, and became Hon Colonel of that unit.

Family
Lord Wolverton married Lady Edith Amelia, daughter of William Ward, 1st Earl of Dudley, in 1895. They had four children:

Hon. George Edward Dudley Carr Glyn (1896–1930), died unmarried.
Hon. Marion Feodorovna Louise Glyn DCVO (1900–1970), married George Villiers, Lord Hyde, and mother of Laurence Villiers, 7th Earl of Clarendon.
Nigel Reginald Victor Glyn, 5th Baron Wolverton (1904–1986), died unmarried.
Hon. Esmé Consuelo Helen Glyn (1908–1991), married Lord Rhyl.

Lord Wolverton died in October 1932, aged 68, and was succeeded in the barony by his second but eldest surviving son, Nigel. Lady Wolverton died in 1956, aged 83.

References

1864 births
1932 deaths
British Army personnel of the Second Boer War
North Somerset Yeomanry officers
Barons in the Peerage of the United Kingdom
Members of London County Council
Frederick